Jefferson Marques da Conceição (born August 21, 1978, in Belo Horizonte, Minas Gerais), known as Jefferson Feijão, is a Brazilian footballer.

He played for Cruzeiro, Desportiva Capixaba, Vitória SC, Criciúma, SC Internacional, Daegu FC, Seongnam Ilhwa Chunma, Goiás,  Botafogo, Avaí FC, Liaoning and Changsha Ginde.

External links
 
 

1978 births
Living people
Association football forwards
Brazilian footballers
Brazilian expatriate footballers
Brazil international footballers
Cruzeiro Esporte Clube players
Desportiva Ferroviária players
Vitória S.C. players
Criciúma Esporte Clube players
Sport Club Internacional players
Daegu FC players
Seongnam FC players
Goiás Esporte Clube players
Botafogo de Futebol e Regatas players
Avaí FC players
Primeira Liga players
K League 1 players
Chinese Super League players
Expatriate footballers in Portugal
Expatriate footballers in South Korea
Expatriate footballers in China
Footballers from Belo Horizonte
Brazilian expatriate sportspeople in Portugal
Brazilian expatriate sportspeople in South Korea
Brazilian expatriate sportspeople in China
Changsha Ginde players